Gynacantha sextans is a species of dragonfly in the family Aeshnidae. It is found in Angola, Cameroon, the Democratic Republic of the Congo, Ivory Coast, Equatorial Guinea, Ghana, Guinea, Nigeria, Uganda, and Zambia. Its natural habitats are subtropical or tropical moist lowland forests and shrub-dominated wetlands.

References

Aeshnidae
Insects described in 1896
Taxonomy articles created by Polbot